The 2014 Australian Handball Club Championship consisted of two components. The first was the Beach Handball competition held in Scarborough, Western Australia during February 2014 and the second is the Indoor titles which was held in Sydney, Australia in March, 2014. Both were organised by the Australian Handball Federation and featured teams from New South Wales, Victoria, Queensland, Northern Territory, Australian Capital Territory, South Australia and hosts Western Australia.

The Beach tournament was split into Men's, Women's and Mixed. The men's title was won by the East Melbourne Spartans from Victoria. The women's and the mixed event was won by Tang from New South Wales.

The Indoor tournament was won by Sydney University. They won the right to represent Australia in the Oceania Handball Champions Cup.

Beach results

Men's final

Women's final

Mixed final

Men's indoor results

Round Robin

Final

3rd place play-off

References

External links
 Indoor Results on AHF webpage. Retrieved 24/09/2014
 Indoor Report on AHF webpage. Retrieved 24/09/2014
 Indoor report on Sydney Uni web page
 Indoor report onNSWHF webpage
 Beach Report on NSWHF page. Retrieved 17 Oct 2014
 Beach Results. Retrieved 17 Oct 2014
 Beach report on VHF page. Retrieved 17 Oct 2014.

Handball competitions in Australia
Handball Club Championship
2013–14 domestic handball leagues